The men's 10,000 metres event at the 2011 Summer Universiade was held on 17 August.

Sergey Rybin of Russia was leading the race for almost the entire distance, but as the race progressed he was tiring rather badly. With 300 metres to go, he was finally overtaken by Suguru Osako of Japan and collapsed from exhaustion soon after. Osako went on to win the race while Rybin had to be taken out on a stretcher.

Results

References
Results

10000
2011